Brad Herzog (born 1968) is an American author and freelance writer. His work includes children's books, a trilogy of American travel memoirs and other works of fiction and nonfiction, and many articles in magazines. Herzog's awards include three CASE Circle of Excellence Awards for educational feature writing from the Council for Advancement and Support of Education, a 2011 Annual Teacher's Choice Award, and an IPPY award as one of the year 2000's "10 Outstanding Books of the Year" for his travel memoir States of Mind.

Life 
Born and raised in Deerfield, Illinois, Herzog obtained a degree in psychology from Cornell University in 1990. After 18 months as a sports reporter for The Ithaca Journal in Ithaca, New York, he returned to Chicago and worked as a freelance writer. He purchased a recreational vehicle and traveled through 48 states in 10 months, which he chronicled and published as States of Mind. In 1997 Herzog moved to the Monterey Peninsula, where as of 2011 he lives with his family.

Freelance career 
Herzog's topics range from civil rights to sports car racing and from Pez to Zen, contributing to magazines such as Sports Illustrated, Writer's Digest, Via Magazine, and Carmel Magazine. He has been a contributing editor for Cornell Alumni Magazine since 1991.

Children's books 
In 2003, Herzog wrote the first of a series of picture books for Sleeping Bear Press. Herzog has written alphabet books about baseball, football, soccer, golf, stock car racing, extreme sports, the Olympic Games and amazing moments in sports.

Travel writer 
Herzog has published a trilogy of travel memoirs about his exploration of life lessons in small-town America. 
In Herzog's first travel memoir, States of Mind, he turns a figurative search for elusive qualities into a literal and allegorical search with essays on 18 hamlets and their eponymous virtues. The book rose to #2 on the Amazon.com best-seller list. It has since been profiled in USA Today.

In 2004, Herzog published his second travel memoir, Small World (Pocket Books), a post 9/11 examination of the state of the union and the ties that bind. Once again, he examined the country's tiniest hamlets – from Rome (Oregon) and Athens (New York) to Jerusalem (Arkansas) and Calcutta (West Virginia).

Turn Left at the Trojan Horse: A Would-be Hero's American Odyssey (Citadel Press, 2010), a cross-country version of the ancient Greek epics, completed Herzog's travel trilogy. It chronicles a trek to his college reunion in Ithaca, as he re-imagines the ancient journey of Odysseus, visiting tiny hamlets with names like Troy (Oregon), Sparta (Wisconsin), Iliad (Montana), Calypso (Montana) and Apollo (Pennsylvania). Upon its publication in June 2010, Turn Left at the Trojan Horse was selected to the Indie Next "Great Reads" list, as chosen by independent booksellers, and subsequently made the Indie Travel Literature Bestseller list. "This is how a quest should be done..." wrote a reviewer in the Los Angeles Times. He also recounts his journey in an interview on Minnesota Public Radio.

Other non-fiction 
Herzog's first published book for adults was The Sports 100: The One Hundred Most Important People in U.S. Sports History (Macmillan, 1995). It profiles and ranks men and women who were most influential in transforming and transcending sports in America.

The Millionaire phenomenon 
In 2000, Herzog was a contestant on the Who Wants to be a Millionaire. His latest book, States of Mind, was in the top ten within 24 hours of being mentioned on the show. Herzog's appearance and the subsequent publicity was profiled in Time magazine, People, and Entertainment Weekly, following an appearance on the Today Show.

RVIA spokesperson 
Since 2000, Herzog is a traveling spokesperson for the Recreation Vehicle Industry Association (RVIA). Since 2008, Herzog is the blogger for the RVIA GoRVing website.

Books 
Travel memoirs:
 Turn Left at the Trojan Horse
 Small World
 States of Mind
 
Other adult nonfiction
The Sports 100: The One Hundred Most Important People in American Sports History
 
Children's titles with Sleeping Bear Press: 
 G is for Gold Medal: An Olympic Alphabet (2011)
 I Spy with My Little Eye Baseball (2011)
 Little Baseball (2011)
 Little Football (2011)
 Little Basketball (2011)
 Little Soccer (2011)
 Full Count: A Baseball Number Book
 S is for Save the Planet: A How-to-be Green Alphabet
 A is for Amazing Moments: A Sports Alphabet
 E is for Extreme: An Extreme Sports Alphabet
 R is for Race: A Stock Car Alphabet
 P is for Putt: A Golf Alphabet
 T is for Touchdown: A Football Alphabet
 H is for Home Run: A Baseball Alphabet
 K is for Kick: A Soccer Alphabet
 
Children's titles with Sports Illustrated Kids:
 Hoopmania
 Seventh Inning Stretch
 Dare to Be Different
 The 20 Greatest Athletes of the 20th Century
 The 50 Greatest Athletes of Today
 Heads Up!
 MVP Sports Puzzles
 Hot Summer Stars
 Olympics 2000
 2000: A Celebration of Sports
 
Children's titles with educational publisher Rigby: 
 Freddy in the Fridge
 The Monster's New Friend
 The Runaway Ball
 The Hero in the Mirror
 Having a Ball
 Shake, Rattle & Roll

References

External links 
 
 Herzog's blog

1968 births
Cornell University alumni
People from Deerfield, Illinois
Writers from Illinois
Living people